The Hanukkah Sessions are a series of video presentations of popular songs originally written or performed by Jewish artists, as covered by musicians Greg Kurstin and Dave Grohl. Since 2020, Kurstin and Grohl have covered eight songs per year for this project, and released one per night to digital streaming platforms for each night of Hanukkah.

Background
During the COVID-19 pandemic in 2020 and 2021, Kurstin (primarily playing keyboards) and Grohl (primarily playing drums) recorded those years' Hanukkah Sessions in Kurstin's home studio. During these times they occasionally featured other performers, such as Peaches singing "Fuck the Pain Away" with them remotely, and Grohl's daughter Violet singing a cover of Amy Winehouse's song "Take the Box".

In 2022, when pandemic conditions had eased, Kurstin and Grohl held a concert with various guests on December 5 at the Largo nightclub in Los Angeles. These guests included Inara George (Kurstin's bandmate from The Bird and the Bee), Beck, P!nk, Jack Black and Kyle Gass of Tenacious D, Karen O, and Grohl's daughter Violet. Director Judd Apatow collaborated with Kurstin and Grohl to make the 2022 edition of the Hanukkah Sessions a fundraiser for the Anti-Defamation League. The songs recorded at this concert were released to streaming platforms one at a time on each night of Hanukkah, in keeping with the pattern established the previous two years.

Table of songs

References

External links
The Hannukah Sessions on Foo Fighters YouTube channel

Hanukkah music
Cultural responses to the COVID-19 pandemic
Dave Grohl
Recurring events established in 2020
Jewish rock musicians
Lists of Jews
Lists of songs
Lists of cover songs